Le Ruisseau may refer to:

 French title of The Virtuous Model (1919), American film directed by Albert Capellani
 Le Ruisseau (1929 film), French film directed by René Hervil
 Le Ruisseau (1938 film), French film directed by Maurice Lehmann and Claude Autant-Lara